Adrapsa despecta is a moth of the family Noctuidae first described by Francis Walker in 1865. It is found in India and Sri Lanka.

References

External links

Moths of Asia
Moths described in 1865
Herminiinae